The title of Viscount Mountjoy has been created three times, twice in the Peerage of Ireland and once in the Peerage of Great Britain. The creations in the Peerage of Ireland were made in 1683 and 1795, and became extinct in 1769 and 1829, respectively. The creation in the Peerage of Great Britain occurred in 1796, as a subsidiary title for the Marquess of Bute, to which title it is still attached.

The titles of Viscount Mountjoy and Baron Stewart of Ramelton in the Peerage of Ireland were conferred upon Sir William Stewart, 3rd Baronet, of Ramelton, in 1683. His grandson the 3rd Viscount Mountjoy was created Earl of Blessington in 1745 and died in 1769, when all his peerage titles became extinct (though the baronetcy remains extant). His cousin Anne, daughter of the Hon. Alexander Stewart and granddaughter of the 1st Viscount Mountjoy, married in 1711 Luke Gardiner, who served as Vice-Treasurer of Ireland. Their grandson Luke was created Baron Mountjoy, of Mountjoy in the County of Tyrone, in 1789 and Viscount Mountjoy in 1795, both in the Peerage of Ireland. His son Charles John Gardiner, 2nd Viscount Mountjoy, was created Earl of Blessington, again in the Peerage of Ireland, in 1816. His second wife was the famous Marguerite, Countess of Blessington. He died without male issue in 1829, when all his titles became extinct.

Charlotte Jane Windsor, daughter of the 2nd Viscount Windsor and 2nd Baron Mountjoy, married the 4th Earl of Bute, and that nobleman was created Marquess of Bute, Earl of Windsor and Viscount Mountjoy in the Isle of Wight in 1796, in the Peerage of Great Britain. These titles remain extant.

Viscounts Mountjoy (1683)
William Stewart, 1st Viscount Mountjoy (1653–1692)
William Stewart, 2nd Viscount Mountjoy (1675–1728)
William Stewart, 3rd Viscount Mountjoy (1709–1769), created Earl of Blessington in 1745

Viscounts Mountjoy (1795)
Luke Gardiner, 1st Viscount Mountjoy (1745–1798)
Charles John Gardiner, 2nd Viscount Mountjoy (1782–1829), elected a representative peer in 1809, created Earl of Blessington in 1816

Viscounts Mountjoy (1796)
see Marquess of Bute

See also
Baron Mountjoy
Earl of Blessington
Marquess of Bute

References

Extinct viscountcies in the Peerage of Ireland
Viscountcies in the Peerage of Great Britain
Noble titles created in 1683
Noble titles created in 1795
Noble titles created in 1796